Denis Dunbar Gibbs FRCP (19 July 1927 - 8 January 2015) was an English physician and president of the History of Medicine Society of the Royal Society of Medicine from 1962 to 1964.

References 

Presidents of the History of Medicine Society
Fellows of the Royal College of Physicians
20th-century English medical doctors
1927 births
2015 deaths